A hexokinase is an enzyme that phosphorylates hexoses (six-carbon sugars), forming hexose phosphate. In most organisms, glucose is the most important substrate for hexokinases, and glucose-6-phosphate is the most important product. Hexokinase possesses the ability to transfer an inorganic phosphate group from ATP to a substrate.

Hexokinases should not be confused with glucokinase, which is a specific hexokinase found in bacteria.  All hexokinases are capable of phosphorylating several hexoses but hexokinase IV(D) is often misleadingly called glucokinase, though it is no more specific for glucose than the other mammalian isoenzymes.

Variation
Genes that encode hexokinase have been discovered in every domain of life, and exist among a variety of species that range from bacteria, yeast, and plants to humans and other vertebrates. The enzymes from yeast, plants and vertebrates all show clear sequence evidence of homology, but those of bacteria may not be related.

They are categorized as actin fold proteins, sharing a common ATP binding site core that is surrounded by more variable sequences which determine substrate affinities and other properties.

Several hexokinase isoenzymes that provide different functions can occur in a single species.

Reaction
The intracellular reactions mediated by hexokinases can be typified as:
Hexose-CH2OH + MgATP → Hexose-CH2O-PO + MgADP + H+
where hexose-CH2OH represents any of several hexoses (like glucose) that contain an accessible -CH2OH moiety.

Consequences of hexose phosphorylation
Phosphorylation of a hexose such as glucose often limits it to a number of intracellular metabolic processes, such as glycolysis or glycogen synthesis. This is because phosphorylated hexoses are charged, and thus more difficult to transport out of a cell.

In patients with essential fructosuria, metabolism of fructose by hexokinase to fructose-6-phosphate is the primary method of metabolizing dietary fructose; this pathway is not significant in normal individuals.

Size of different isoforms
Most bacterial hexokinases are approximately 50 kDa in size. Multicellular organisms including  plants and animals often have more than one hexokinase isoform. Most are about 100 kDa in size and consist of two halves (N and C terminal), which share much sequence homology. This suggests an evolutionary origin by duplication and fusion of a 50kDa ancestral hexokinase similar to those of bacteria.

Types of mammalian hexokinase
There are four important mammalian hexokinase isozymes that vary in subcellular locations and kinetics with respect to different substrates and conditions, and physiological function. They were designated hexokinases A, B, C, and D on the basis of their electrophoretic mobility. The alternative names hexokinases I, II, III, and IV (respectively) proposed later are widely used.

Hexokinases I, II, and III
Hexokinases I, II, and III are referred to as low-Km isoenzymes because of a high affinity for glucose (below 1 mM). Hexokinases I and II follow Michaelis-Menten kinetics at physiological concentrations of substrates. All three are strongly inhibited by their product, glucose-6-phosphate. Molecular masses are around 100 kDa. Each consists of two similar 50kDa halves, but only in hexokinase II do both halves have functional active sites.

 Hexokinase I/A is found in all mammalian tissues, and is considered a "housekeeping enzyme," unaffected by most physiological, hormonal, and metabolic changes.
 Hexokinase II/B constitutes the principal regulated isoenzyme in many cell types and is increased in many cancers. It is the hexokinase found in muscle and heart. Hexokinase II is also located at the mitochondria outer membrane so it can have direct access to ATP. The relative specific activity of hexokinase II increases with pH at least in a pH range from 6.9 to 8.5.
 Hexokinase III/C is substrate-inhibited by glucose at physiological concentrations. Little is known about the regulatory characteristics of this isoenzyme.

Hexokinase IV ("glucokinase")

Mammalian hexokinase IV, also referred to as glucokinase, differs from other hexokinases in kinetics and functions.

The location of the phosphorylation on a subcellular level occurs when glucokinase translocates between the cytoplasm and nucleus of liver cells.  Glucokinase can only phosphorylate glucose if the concentration of this substrate is high enough; it does not follow Henri–Michaelis–Menten kinetics, and has no Km; It is half-saturated at glucose concentrations 100 times higher than those of hexokinases I, II, and III.

Hexokinase IV is monomeric, about 50kDa, displays positive cooperativity with glucose, and is not allosterically inhibited by its product, glucose-6-phosphate.

Hexokinase IV is present in the liver, pancreas, hypothalamus, small intestine, and perhaps certain other neuroendocrine cells, and plays an important regulatory role in carbohydrate metabolism. In the β cells of the pancreatic islets, it serves as a glucose sensor to control insulin release, and similarly controls glucagon release in the α cells. In hepatocytes of the liver, glucokinase responds to changes of ambient glucose levels by increasing or reducing glycogen synthesis.

In glycolysis
Glucose is unique in that it can be used to produce ATP by all cells in both the presence and absence of molecular oxygen (O2). The first step in glycolysis is the phosphorylation of glucose by hexokinase.

   

By catalyzing the phosphorylation of glucose to yield glucose 6-phosphate, hexokinases maintain the downhill concentration gradient that favors the facilitated transport of glucose into cells. This reaction also initiates all physiologically relevant pathways of glucose utilization, including glycolysis and the pentose phosphate pathway. The addition of a charged phosphate group at the 6-position of hexoses also ensures 'trapping' of glucose and 2-deoxyhexose glucose analogs (e.g. 2-deoxyglucose, and 2-fluoro-2-deoxyglucose) within cells, as charged hexose phosphates cannot easily cross the cell membrane.

Association with mitochondria
Hexokinases I and II can associate physically to the outer surface of the external membrane of mitochondria through specific binding to a porin, or voltage dependent anion channel. This association confers hexokinase direct access to ATP generated by mitochondria, which is one of the two substrates of hexokinase. Mitochondrial hexokinase is highly elevated in rapidly growing malignant tumor cells, with levels up to 200 times higher than normal tissues. Mitochondrially bound hexokinase has been demonstrated to be the driving force for the extremely high glycolytic rates that take place aerobically in tumor cells (the so-called Warburg effect described by Otto Heinrich Warburg in 1930).

Hydropathy plot 

The potential transmembrane portions of a protein can be detected by hydropathy analysis. A hydropathy analysis uses an algorithm that quantifies the hydrophobic character at each position along the polypeptide chain. One of the accepted hydropathy scales is that of Kyte and Doolittle which relies on the generation of hydropathy plots. In these plots, the negative numbers represent hydrophilic regions and the positive numbers represent hydrophobic regions on the y-axis. A potential transmembrane domain is about 20 amino acids long on the x-axis.

A hydropathy analysis of hexokinase in yeast has been created by these standards. It appears as if hexokinase possesses a single potential transmembrane domain located around amino acid 400. Therefore, hexokinase is most likely not an integral membrane protein in yeast.

Deficiency
Hexokinase deficiency is a genetic autosomal recessive disease that causes chronic haemolytic anaemia.  Chronic haemolytic anaemia is caused by a mutation in the gene that  codes for hexokinase. The mutation causes a reduction of the hexokinase activity, and hence hexokinase deficiency.

See also 
Allostery
Enzyme catalysis
Flexible linker
Fluorescent glucose biosensors
Glucokinase
Glycolysis
Glycogen
Glucose 6-phosphatase
Hexose phosphate uptake
Insulin
Protein domain dynamics
Protein flexibility

References

Glycolysis enzymes
EC 2.7.1
Moonlighting proteins
Glycolysis